Carex crawfordii, common name  Crawford sedge, is a species of Carex native to North America.

Conservation status within the United States
It is listed as endangered in Illinois and Pennsylvania. It is listed as a special concern species and believed extirpated in Connecticut.

Gallery

References

crawfordii